Borodino class motorship was a class of Russian river passenger ships. The series is named after Borodino village, and the ships themselves are notable for their size, power, and use in  the Russo-Japanese War and the Bolshevik Revolution.

Origins
The Borodino class were some of the first screw ships for passengers on the various rivers in Russia. The ships were built between 1911 and 1917 at the Kolomenskiy shipyard for Kaukas & Mercury primarily for passenger service, although some also performed postal work.

Specifications 
The ships each had a pair of six cylinder diesel engines, and had double decks. Capable of carrying 500 passengers and up to 300 tons of cargo, they were not small paddle boats, but large ships, over 300 feet long over 30 feet wide.

History of the series
During the Bolshevik Civil War, the Borodino class ships were used as troop transports in service with the Red Army. One of the ships was temporarily the flagship of an ad-hoc war fleet, mostly of other retrofitted river craft and fishing vessels.

In World War II a few of the ships were used to evacuate people and wounded soldiers from Stalingrad, but most were tasked with carrying valuable equipment and material back away from the German front towards the interior of the Soviet Union.

After 1960, the remaining ships not destroyed by war were rebuilt and refurbished, and operated by the Volga Shipping Company.

Ships

References

River cruise ships
Ships of Russia
Ships of the Soviet Union